A constitutional referendum was held in Togo on 30 December 1979, alongside simultaneous general elections. The changes to the constitution would make the country a presidential republic and a one-party state and were approved by 99.87% of voters with a 99.4% turnout.

Results

References

1979 referendums
1979 in Togo
1979
Constitutional referendums
December 1979 events in Africa